Maxwell Farm, also known as the O'Donnell-Hill Farm, is a historic home and farm located at Jackson, Washington County, New York. The house was built about 1815, and expanded and updated about 1850 in the Greek Revival style.  It is a two-story, five bay, heavy timber frame dwelling with a rear ell.  Also on the property are the contributing main barn (c. 1790 and later), corn crib (c. 1815), secondary barn (c. 1850), east barn (c. 1850 and later), milk house (c. 1920), garage (c. 1920), and well and hand pump.

It was added to the National Register of Historic Places in 2012.

References

Farms on the National Register of Historic Places in New York (state)
Greek Revival houses in New York (state)
Houses completed in 1815
Buildings and structures in Washington County, New York
National Register of Historic Places in Washington County, New York